The knockout stage of the 2012–13 EHF Champions League began on 13 March 2013 and concluded on 2 June 2013 with the final at Lanxess Arena in Cologne, Germany.

Times up to 30 March 2013 (last 16) are UTC+1, thereafter (quarterfinals and final four) times are UTC+2.

Round and draw dates
All draws are held at EHF headquarters in Vienna, Austria.

Qualified teams

Last 16
The draw was held on 26 February 2013 at 12:30 in Vienna, Austria. The first legs were played on 13–17 March, and the second legs were played on 20–24 March 2013.

|}

First leg

Second leg

HSV Hamburg won 66–60 on aggregate.

MKB Veszprém won 56–45 on aggregate.

Flensburg won 55–50 on aggregate.

Metalurg Skopje won 50–45 on aggregate.

Vive Targi Kielce won 57–53 on aggregate.

Barcelona won 58–50 on aggregate.

Atlético Madrid won 56–55 on aggregate.

THW Kiel won 65–63 on aggregate.

Quarterfinals

Seedings
The draw was held on 26 March 2013 at 11:00 in Vienna, Austria.

Matches
The first legs were played on 17–21 April, and the second legs were played on 24–28 April 2013.

|}

First leg

Second leg

THW Kiel won 61–59 on aggregate.

Barcelona won 52–49 on aggregate.

Vive Targi Kielce won 53–40 on aggregate.

HSV Hamburg won 55–51 on aggregate.

Final four
The draw was held on 2 May 2013.

Semifinals

Third place game

Final

References

External links
Official website

2012–13 EHF Champions League